Gonzalo Germán Pérez Corbalán (born 4 January 2001) is a Uruguayan professional footballer who plays as a defender for Liverpool Montevideo.

Career
A youth academy graduate of Liverpool Montevideo, Pérez signed his first professional with the club ahead of 2020 season. He made his professional debut on 8 August 2020 in a 1–1 draw against Rentistas.

Career statistics

Honours
Liverpool Montevideo
 Supercopa Uruguaya: 2023

References

External links
 

2001 births
Living people
Association football defenders
Uruguayan footballers
Uruguayan Primera División players
Liverpool F.C. (Montevideo) players